Saratovskiy Ledokol (Russian: Саратовский ледокол; literally: Saratov icebreaker) was a Russian steam-powered twin-screw icebreaker built for the Ryazan-Ural Railway Company at Sir WG Armstrong Mitchell & Company in Newcastle upon Tyne, United Kingdom, in 1896. She was primarily used to escort a railway ferry across Volga during the winter months, but could also carry cargo and passengers on her own.

Saratovskiy Ledokol sank by the railway bridge in 1968. There are plans to lift the vessel and restore her as a monument by the river in 2021. The lifting operation commenced in June 2020. As of 2021, the salvage progress is unknown.

References 

Icebreakers of the Soviet Union
Ships built by Armstrong Whitworth
1895 ships